Infinity Insurance Park, formerly known as University Park Stadium and FIU Baseball Stadium, is a baseball stadium located on the campus of Florida International University in Westchester, Florida, United States. It is the home venue of the FIU Panthers college baseball team of the Division I Conference USA. The facility opened on January 26, 1996, with a 1–0 FIU victory against Bethune-Cookman and was built on the same site as its predecessor, which had stood since 1965 (albeit with a slightly differently angled field configuration). All-American Evan W. Thomas threw a complete game shutout.
University Park Stadium has a seating capacity of 2,000 people. The largest crowd in the stadium's history was 2,473 on February 26, 2002, when FIU defeated their cross-town rivals the Miami Hurricanes 7–1.

The team spent the 2005 season at the Homestead Sports Complex in Homestead while University Park Stadium underwent an expansion. In 2005, the facility hosted the Sun Belt Conference Baseball Tournament.

In 2018 Infinity Insurance acquired the naming rights for the stadium.

See also

 List of NCAA Division I baseball venues
FIU Stadium (FIU Football)
FIU Arena (FIU Basketball)

References

External links
FIU Sports Stadium Page

College baseball venues in the United States
FIU Panthers baseball
Baseball venues in Florida